Conway is a Welsh, Irish, and Scottish given name, the origin of which is unclear. It may originally have been an Anglicization of Welsh Conwy (derived from Old Welsh cyn "chief" and gwy "water"); of Irish Conbhuidhe or O Connmhachain; or of Scottish Gaelic Mac Conmheadha or Mac Connmhaigh.

Notable people with the name include:

 Conway Baker (1911–1997), American National Football League player
 Conway Barbour (1818–1876), American former slave and Arkansas state legislator
 Conway Berners-Lee (1921–2019), British mathematician and computer scientist
 Conway Elder (1880–1957), Justice of the Supreme Court of Missouri
 Conway Hayman (1949–2020), American former football player and coach
 Conway LeBleu (1918–2007), American politician 
 Conway Savage (1960–2018), Australian rock musician
 Conway Tearle (1878–1938), American early film actor
 Conway Twitty (1933–1993), American country music singer

References

English masculine given names
Irish masculine given names
Scottish masculine given names
Welsh masculine given names